

The European Beer Consumers Union (EBCU) is a consumer organisation founded in 1990 in Bruges, Belgium, by three national beer organisations: CAMRA (United Kingdom), Objectieve Bierproevers (Belgium) and PINT (Netherlands).

History
In 2003, Objectieve Bierproevers was replaced by Zythos.

In 2008, the member organisations signed up to a constitution which defined the formal aims and structure and the role of traditional beer as a "prime component of European culture, history and daily life".

Beoir, an Irish consumer organisation setup in 2010 to promote Irish craft brewing and microbreweries, became the organisation's 13th member in 2012.

In 2012, Terry Lock, chairman since 1999, retired and Henri Reuchlin from the Netherlands was elected to replace him. Bo Jensen from Denmark replaced Henri Reuchlin as chairman in 2018, serving until 2022. In 2022, André Brunnsberg of Finnish organisation Olutliitto was elected Chair.

Members
As of March 2023, the union's website listed 19 members from 16 European countries:

Aims
The union campaigns on European level to:

To preserve and maintain the diversity of the traditional European beer cultures, with particular regard to local, regional and national brewing and beer styles
To protect the consumer from the imposition of unfair pricing by opposing unreasonable taxation or exploitative business practices
To ensure that the consumer receives the best factual information about any beer on commercial sale.

References

External links
 Official Site

Beer organizations
Consumer organisations in Belgium
Organizations established in 1990
Lists of organizations based in Europe
Organizations based in Europe